The GFA Premier League is the top football league in Grenada. It was created in 1983 and is headed by the Grenada Football Association. 10 teams participate in this league.

The 10th-placed team is relegated to the Grenada First Division, while the 9th-placed team plays a play-off with the 2nd-placed team  of the second level.

Despite being a league competition in CONCACAF none of the Grenadan teams ever played in CFU Club Championship or CONCACAF Champions' Cup.

Some of the matches are played at the 9,000 capacity Grenada National Stadium. In 2014, the match between PetroCaribe Queens Park Rangers and Nixon's Electrical Happy Hill FC was the first live broadcast of a Premier Division match.

Current teams

Eagles Super Strikers
FC Camerhogne
Spartans
Hard Rock
Hurricanes
Mount Rich
Paradise
Queens Park Rangers
St. John's
Chantimelle

2021–22 stadiums

Previous winners

1983: unknown
1984: Queens Park Rangers
1985: unknown
1986: Carenage
1987–93: unknown
1994: Queens Park Rangers
1995: Queens Park Rangers
1996: Barba Super Stars
1997: Seven Seas Rock City
1998: Fontenoy United
1999: SAFL
2000: GBSS
2001: GBSS
2002: Queens Park Rangers
2003: Carib Hurricane
2004: abandoned
2005: Paradise
2006: Carib Hurricane
2007: Paradise
2008: Carib Hurricane
2009: abandoned
2010: Paradise
2011: Hard Rock
2012: Hard Rock
2013: Hard Rock
2014: Paradise
2015: Carib Hurricane
2016: not finished
2017–18: Carib Hurricane
2018–19: Paradise
2019–20: Hurricanes
2020–21: not held due to COVID-19
2021–22: Hurricanes

2021–22 stadiums

Top scorers

References

External links
Official Site
Grenada - List of Champions, RSSSF.com

Football competitions in Grenada
Top level football leagues in the Caribbean
Sports leagues established in 1983
1983 establishments in Grenada